2,4-Dibromophenol is a brominated derivative of phenol with the molecular formula C6H4Br2O.  It belongs to the bromobenzenes, which are organic compounds containing bromine atoms attached to a benzene ring.

Properties
At room temperature, 2,4-dibromophenol is a solid with needle-like crystals. It is soluble in water, ethanol, ether and benzene and slightly soluble in carbon tetrachloride.

Occurrence
2,4-Dibromophenol is found in certain molluscs and crustaceans, as well as the acorn worm Saccoglossus bromophenolosus, which is named after it.

References

Phenols
Bromoarenes